Zuiderwoude is a village in the municipality of Waterland, province of North Holland, Netherlands. It lies about 2 km (1.2 mi) south of the municipal administrative centre Monnickendam. In 2021, the statistical area of Zuiderwoude had a population of 320, up from 260 in 2004.

History
The village has been known under various names throughout history: Zuderwout (1340), Zuderwoude (1342), Zuiderwoude (1352), Suyderwoude (1358), Zuyrwoude (1494), Zuider woude (1573), Suyderwoudt (1745). In 1628, Zuiderwoude formed a heerlijkheid with neighbouring Uitdam, until both villages became part of the municipality of Broek in Waterland in 1811.

The current village church (Kerk Zuiderwoude) from 1877 stands where a church has stood since the 11th century. Its address is Dorpstraat 1.

References

Populated places in North Holland
Waterland